Adam Aitken is an Australian poet.

Early life
Australian writer Adam Aitken was born in London in 1960. He spent his early childhood with relatives in Thailand, and was educated at a convent in Malaysia, then a school in Perth Western Australia, before his family moved to Sydney, Australia in 1969. His father was born in Melbourne and as a young man worked as a copy-writer and advertising executive, then re-trained as a landscape architect. He was a respected ceramics critic and in the early 1970s was an activist in the Anti-Vietnam War Moratorium movement. His mother is Thai and worked in the Samuel Taylor Factory in Sydney, then as an interpreter.

Career
Aitken began writing in the mid-1970s and majored in English and Art Film History at the University of Sydney. He has also completed a Master's in linguistics and a Doctorate in Creative Arts from the Centre for New Writing, University of Technology, Sydney. His doctoral thesis was titled "Writing the hybrid: Asian imaginaries in Australian literature". He was associate poetry editor for HEAT magazine. 

Aitken has published seven full length collections of poetry, and his work appears in numerous literary journals and poetry anthologies, most recently Contemporary Australian Poetry. A graduate of the University of Sydney English Department, he studied the Metaphysical poets, Shakespeare, the Augustan poets and the Romantics, then moved on to courses in Modern American poetry and fiction under Don Anderson and Jim Tulip. There he studied creative writing informally at lunch time poetry workshops convened by Dennis Haskell, and became part of a loose community of poets then based in inner city Sydney, including Gig Ryan, John Forbes, John Tranter, Pam Brown, Kit Kelen, Stephen Kelen, and Anna Couani. He also studied Fine Arts and Cinema studies in his Honours year under film theorist Alan Cholodenko. 

He is considered to be a poet of no particular school or trend, postcolonial and lyrical, and with a postmodern commitment to language play and experimentation. As with his contemporaries post-1968, his influences have been broad, but predominantly those of modern German, French, British and American poets, including some of the New York School. Aitken's poems "fulfil the old Horatian ideal of both teaching and delighting". 

In 1996, his second poetry collection In One House was considered one of the best poetry collections of that year. In 2001, his third collection Romeo and Juliet in Subtitles, was shortlisted for the John Bray South Australian Literary Festival Award, and was runner-up for The Age Book of the Year poetry prize. In 2009, his fourth collection, Eighth Habitation, was published by Giramondo Press and shortlisted for the 2010 John Bray Award. His memoir One Hundred Letters Home (Vagabond Press, 2016) was nominated for the Association for the Study of Australian Literature (ASAL) Gold Medal. In 2018, Aitken's collection Archipelago (Vagabond Press, 2017) was shortlisted for the Kenneth Slessor Prize for Poetry and the Prime Minister's Literary Awards. 

In 2000 Aitken successfully collaborated with landscape architect Gillian Smart and the Centennial Park Trust to provide inscriptions and a commemoration of the First Peoples for the 'Avenue of Nations sculpture. According to Centennial Parklands Smart's "sculpture was developed as a vehicle for communication, a connection, between cultures. It features a series of hanging shells crafted from bronze, with selected words celebrating Australian society, engraved on them. Hand Upon Hand  is interactive and tactile, and encourages unity through experience. Over time and use, the layering of hands on the shells will enhance its meaning, and reinforce the unity and diversity of our cultural backgrounds."

His writing continues to demonstrate a deep interest in issues of cross-cultural identity and family connection in a transnational context, and cultural hybridity. Adam's work has been translated into French, Swedish, German, Polish, Malay, Mandarin and Russian, and is published internationally, most notably in Poetry Magazine. He has also served as a co-editor (with Kim Cheng Boey and Michelle Cahill) of the Contemporary Asian Australian Poets anthology, a book now included in the NSW High School English syllabus.

In December 2021 he won the Patrick White Award.

Aitken's seventh collection is Revenants (Giramondo Press 2022). It was shortlisted for the 2023 Kenneth Slessor Prize for Poetry.

Books
 Letter to Marco Polo, Island Press, 1985
 In One House, HarperCollins/Paper Bark Press, 1996
 Romeo And Juliet in Subtitles, Brandl & Schlesinger, 2000
 (chapbook) Impermanence.com, Vagabond Press, 2004
 Eighth Habitation, Giramondo Publishing, 2009
 (chapbook) The Bats of Angkor Wat, Picaro Press, 2011
 (chapbook)Tonto's Revenge, TinFish Press, 2011
 (chapbook) November Already, Vagabond Press, 2013
 (As co-editor) [Contemporary Asian Australian Poetshttps://puncherandwattmann.com/product/contemporary-asian-australian-poets/ Contemporary Asian Australian Poets], Puncher and Wattmann, 2013. Edited by Adam Aitken, Kim Cheng Boey and Michelle Cahill.
 One Hundred Letters Home, Vagabond Press, 2016
 Archipelago, Vagabond Press, 2017
 (chapbook) Notes on the River, Little Window Press, 2017
 Revenants, Giramondo Publishing, 2022.

References

External links
 Adam Aitken homepage
 Adam Aitken Cambodia blog
 Line and Space Lecture
 Interview and reading of 'Costumes'
 Adam Aitken at Australia Poetry International Web
 Three poems at Jacket
 Five poems at Lyrikline.org

1960 births
Australian poets
Living people
Australian people of Thai descent
British emigrants to Australia
University of Sydney alumni
University of Technology Sydney alumni